East Coast FM (formerly known as BLB, Horizon FM, then East Coast Radio) is an Irish local radio station broadcasting from Bray, County Wicklow under a sound broadcasting contract from the Broadcasting Authority of Ireland

The station operates in County Wicklow and into the adjoining counties of Dublin, Kildare, Carlow and Wexford, broadcasting on the following frequencies: 94.9 FM, 96.2 FM, 99.9 FM, 102.9 FM and 104.4 FM in Arklow. To achieve coverage of all of its franchise area, it requires six transmitters including stations at Bray Head, Wicklow Head, Avoca, Arklow, Baltinglass and a transmitter located at Slieve Thoul in Saggart County Dublin where the Wicklow, Kildare and Dublin borders meet.

History
East Coast FM began as BLB (Bray Local Broadcasting) as an unlicensed operator and was launched as "Horizon Radio" when it received a licence from The Independent Radio & Television Commission (now known as The Broadcasting Authority of Ireland) which later merged with South Wicklow's Ezy103 to become East Coast Radio .

In 2002, The station was renamed from "East Coast Radio" to "East Coast FM" and they moved from its Victorian premises at Prince of Wales Terrace on Quinsboro Road, Bray (where it had been located since 1985) to a state-of-the-art Radio centre complex in Ballywaltrim, Bray. The station is located on Killarney Road. BLB had operated out of a rooftop office on top of what is now Katie Gallagher's pub on Strand Road in the early 1980s.

East Coast FM is owned by East Coast Radio Limited. Denis O'Brien's Communicorp group, is a former shareholder in the station - it was a shareholder from 1998 to 2008.  East Coast FM has the largest weekly reach (49%) of any station measured in County Wicklow.

Outside broadcast unit

In 2014 the station acquired an outside broadcast vehicle,
a Mercedes Sprinter previously operated by KFM (Kildare) known as "The East Coast FM Roadcaster" which has been seen regularly broadcasting some shows all across various parts of County Wicklow.

Awards

See also 
Radio in Ireland

References

External links 
Official website

Bray, County Wicklow
Mass media in County Wicklow
Radio stations in the Republic of Ireland